Journal of Futures Markets is a monthly peer-reviewed academic journal covers developments in financial futures and derivatives. The editor-in-chief is Robert Webb. The journal covers subjects including: futures, derivatives, risk management and control, financial engineering, new financial instruments, hedging strategies, analysis of trading systems, legal, accounting, and regulatory issues, and portfolio optimization. It is published by Wiley-Blackwell.

According to the Journal Citation Reports, its 2016 impact factor is 1.291, ranking it 41 out of 96 journals in the category "Business, Finance".

References

External links 
 

Wiley-Blackwell academic journals
Publications established in 1981
Monthly journals
Business and management journals
English-language journals